The 2023 Metro Manila Summer Film Festival is a planned iteration of the annual Metro Manila Summer Film Festival to be held in Metro Manila and throughout the Philippines. It is to be organized by the Metropolitan Manila Development Authority (MMDA) in partnership with the Cinema Exhibitors Association of the Philippines. The theme of the film festival would be "Tuloy-tuloy ang Saya".

The inaugural edition was supposed to be held in 2020, but was cancelled due to the COVID-19 pandemic.

Following the organization of the 2022 Metro Manila Film Festival, the MMDA announced on January 9, 2023 that the summer film festival will be held from April 8 to 18, 2023. The parade of stars is scheduled to be held on April 1, 2023 while the awards night will be on April 11, 2023.

The deadline of submission for entries was set on February 17, 2023.

Entries
The Metro Manila Film Festival (MMFF) Executive Committee announced the eight official entries on February 24, 2023.

References

2023 MMSFF
2023 MMSFF
MMFF
2023 MMSFF
Metro Manila Summer Film Festival